The FIL World Luge Championships 1983 took place in Lake Placid, New York, United States. It marked the first time that the championships took place outside Europe.

Men's singles

Zanjonc becomes the first non-European champion of the event. He is the first Canadian to medal at the World Championships.

Women's singles

Men's doubles

Medal table

References
Men's doubles World Champions
Men's singles World Champions
Women's singles World Champions

FIL World Luge Championships
International luge competitions hosted by the United States
1983 in luge
1983 in sports in New York (state)
1983 in American sports